Petrozavodsk is the capital city of the Republic of Karelia, Russia.

Petrozavodsk may also refer to:
Petrozavodsk Airport, an airport in the Republic of Karelia, Russia
Petrozavodsk Kongs, an American football team based in Petrozavodsk, Russia